Vitaliy Hryhorovych Reva (born 19 November 1974) is a Ukrainian professional football player who plays for Ukrainian Second League club Livyi Bereh Kyiv. He is also the goalkeeping coach of Ukraine national under-21 football team. Born in Dnipropetrovsk, Ukraine, Reva is a former Dynamo Kyiv and Ukraine national football team goalkeeper.

Club career

Polihraftekhnika Oleksandriya
Born in Dnipropetrovsk, Reva started his professional career at Polihraftekhnika Oleksandriya in 1993–1995 in the Ukrainian First League.

CSKA Kyiv
He then moved to CSKA-Borysfen Kyiv (later FC Arsenal Kyiv), where he debuted in the Vyshcha Liha and played 6 seasons until 2001.

Dynamo Kyiv
In 2001, he moved to Dynamo Kyiv where he played until 2005.

Loan to Tavriya Simferopol
During the 2005–06 season, Reva was loaned to Tavriya Simferopol until the end of 2005.

Livyi Bereh Kyiv
At 46 in 2021, Reva appeared listed for the Ukrainian Second League club Livyi Bereh Kyiv.

Honours

Dynamo Kyiv
 Ukrainian Premier League: 2002–03, 2003–04 
 Ukrainian Cup: 2002–03, 2004–05

Personal life
Reva is the son of former Ukrainian Minister of Emergencies from 2004 to 2005 Hryhoriy Reva.

External links
 
 
 Profile at Arsenal Kyiv official website
 Profile at soccer.ru

1974 births
Living people
Footballers from Dnipro
Ukrainian footballers
Ukraine international footballers
Ukrainian football managers
FC Oleksandriya players
FC Dynamo Kyiv players
FC Dynamo-2 Kyiv players
FC Dynamo-3 Kyiv players
FC Arsenal Kyiv players
SC Tavriya Simferopol players
FC Obolon-Brovar Kyiv players
FC CSKA Kyiv players
FC Kryvbas Kryvyi Rih players
FC Livyi Bereh Kyiv players
Ukrainian Premier League players
Ukrainian First League players
Ukrainian Second League players
Association football goalkeepers